Pigritia fidella is a moth in the family Blastobasidae. It is found in the United States, including Pennsylvania, Maine and Washington DC.

Adults have been recorded on wing in June and July.

References

Moths described in 1910
Blastobasidae